Gabrovo is a village in the municipality of Delčevo, North Macedonia.

Demographics
According to the 2002 census, the village had a total of 794 inhabitants. Ethnic groups in the village include:

Macedonians 791
Other 3

References

Villages in Delčevo Municipality